The Federal Public Service Commission (FPSC) is a federal agency of Government of Pakistan that is responsible for recruiting civil servants  and bureaucrats for Government of Pakistan.

History 
The Public Service Commission was set up for the first time in British colonial rule in 1926. After independence, the commission was established in Pakistan in 1947 under the provision of Government of Pakistan Act.

Functioning 
At present, the commission is functioning under article 242 of the constitution of Islamic Republic of Pakistan. It has been provided autonomy under the Rules of Business, 1973 and FPSC Regulations, 1978 in its working. The commission has also been given administrative as well as, to some extent,

Composition Of The Commission
The commission consists of a chairman and the members. The chairman is
appointed by the President of Pakistan, in his discretion,
under Article 242 (IA) of the Constitution of Pakistan (1973).
The members are appointed by the president on the advice of the Prime Minister of Pakistan. The commission is assisted by the secretary, who provides a link
among the commission, its secretariat and the government agencies.

About CSS Examination (Central Superior Services of Pakistan)

CSS is a competitive examination through which FPSC recruits the bureaucrats. It is the biggest competitive examination of Pakistan for recruiting bureaucrats.

See also 

 Punjab Public Service Commission
 Sindh Public Service Commission
 Khyber Pakhtunkhwa Public Service Commission
 Balochistan Public Service Commission
 Azad Jammu and Kashmir Public Service Commission

References

External links
 Federal Public Service Commission homepage 

Civil service of Pakistan
Pakistan federal departments and agencies
Pakistani public service commissions
1947 establishments in Pakistan
Government agencies established in 1947